Alaskan Coast Range is an 1889 landscape painting by Albert Bierstadt that presently hangs in the Smithsonian American Art Museum. While traveling through British Columbia, Bierstadt took a steamship to Alaska in search of more rugged landscapes. He ended up shipwrecked in Loring, Alaska. While sheltering in a nearby Native American settlement, he drew his littoral Alaskan surroundings; this work is most likely an oil sketch made for further detailing.

References

 

Paintings by Albert Bierstadt
Paintings in the collection of the Smithsonian American Art Museum
1889 paintings
Water in art